John Rickman may refer to:
John Rickman (activist) (1910–1937), British communist activist 
John Rickman (broadcaster) (1913–1997), British broadcaster and journalist
John Rickman (parliamentary official)  (1771–1840), British statistician and parliamentary official
John Rickman (psychoanalyst) (1891–1951), British psychoanalyst